The seventh Asian Championships in Athletics were held in 1987 in Singapore.

Medal summary

Men's events

Women's events

Medal table

See also
1987 in athletics (track and field)

External links
GBR Athletics

Asian Athletics Championships
Asian
International athletics competitions hosted by Singapore
Asian Athletics Championships, 1987
Asian Championships in Athletics